Emil Ludwig Feuchtmann Pérez (born 1 June 1983, Punta Arenas) is a Chilean handball player for BM Benidorm and the Chilean national team.

He participated at the 2017 World Men's Handball Championship.

He is the brother of Inga, Harald and Erwin who are both handball players themselves.

References

1983 births
Living people
People from Punta Arenas
Chilean male handball players
Chilean people of German descent
Expatriate handball players
Chilean expatriate sportspeople in France
Chilean expatriate sportspeople in Switzerland
Pan American Games medalists in handball
Pan American Games silver medalists for Chile
Pan American Games bronze medalists for Chile
Handball players at the 2003 Pan American Games
Handball players at the 2007 Pan American Games
Handball players at the 2011 Pan American Games
Handball players at the 2019 Pan American Games
South American Games bronze medalists for Chile
South American Games medalists in handball
Competitors at the 2018 South American Games
Medalists at the 2019 Pan American Games
Medalists at the 2011 Pan American Games
21st-century Chilean people